Glenridge is a light rail station that is currently under construction. It will be part of the Purple Line in Maryland, United States. The station will be located southwest of the intersection of Veterans Parkway and Annapolis Road.

History 
The Purple Line system is under construction as of 2022 and is scheduled to open in 2026.

Station layout
The station consists of two side platforms on the southern side of Veterans Parkway, just east of Annapolis Road.

References

Hyattsville, Maryland
Purple Line (Maryland)
Railway stations scheduled to open in 2026
Transportation in Prince George's County, Maryland
Railway stations in Prince George's County, Maryland